Zhang Hongmin (born 13 March 1961) is a Chinese news presenter for China Central Television (CCTV), the main state announcer of China. He won the Golden Mic Award in 2009.

He is known in China as an announcer for the 7:00 pm CCTV news program Xinwen Lianbo, shown all over China on various networks and internationally, which is one of the most watched news programs in the world.

Biography
Zhang was born in Beijing in March 1961, with his ancestral home in Tang County, Hebei. After graduating from the Communication University of China in 1982 he was assigned to China Central Television to host Xinwen Lianbo.

On June 4, 1989, he and Du Xian reported that the People's Liberation Army had cleared thousands of  protesting students from Tian'anmen Square. Du Xian was forced to resign for expressing sympathy, but Zhang Hongmin was released.

Works

Television
 Xinwen Lianbo

Awards
 2009 Golden Mic Award.

References

1961 births
People from Beijing
Communication University of China alumni
Living people
Chinese television presenters
CCTV newsreaders and journalists